Ab Mahi (also Romanized as Āb Māhī and Āb-e Māhi) is a village in Poshteh-ye Zilayi Rural District, Sarfaryab District, Charam County, Kohgiluyeh and Boyer-Ahmad Province, Iran. At the 2006 census, its population was 335, in 58 families.

References 

Populated places in Charam County